JAWS Scripting Language (JSL) is a proprietary programming language that allows the interoperation of the JAWS (Job Access With Speech) screen reading program for the visually impaired and other applications. It is a compiled language, allowing for source code protection.  "JAWS scripting" commonly refers to customization of the built-in, user-editable utilities of JAWS and editing of its configuration files, as well as the writing of original scripts. JSL acts as an API (application programming interface) and allows users to combine JAWS scripting, Microsoft Active Accessibility scripting, and document object model scripting.

External links
 List of resources for JAWS Scripting provided by Freedom Scientific

Scripting languages
Screen readers

es:Lenguaje interpretado JAWS